= FTP Explorer =

FTP Explorer is an FTP client application for the Microsoft Windows operating system which was originally developed in 1996 by Alan Chavis, founder of FTPx Corp.

One of the first "explorer style" FTP clients, FTP Explorer was designed to look and feel very similar to the explorer file system view of the Windows user interface, with a tree view containing folders on the left and a list view containing files and folders on the right.

FTP Explorer pioneered more advanced FTP features such as background downloading and multiple active connections and became popular.

FTP Explorer has been mentioned in numerous publications and included on the CD-ROM inserts of many books.

== Licensing ==
FTP Explorer is free for educational use. After a 15-day trial period, users are required to purchase a license for US$35.99.
